The Bridges Organization is an organization that was founded in Kansas, United States, in 1998 with the goal of promoting interdisciplinary work in mathematics and art. The Bridges Conference is an annual conference on connections between art and mathematics. The conference features papers, educational workshops, an art exhibition, a mathematical poetry reading, and a short movie festival.

List of Bridges conferences

References

External links

1998 establishments in Kansas
Arts organizations established in 1998
Arts organizations based in Kansas
Mathematics organizations
Mathematics and art